To Kill a Mockingbird is a 2018 play based on the 1960 novel of the same name by Harper Lee, adapted for the stage by Aaron Sorkin. It opened on Broadway at the Shubert Theatre on December 13, 2018. The play opened in London's West End at the Gielgud Theatre in March 2022. The show follows the story of Atticus Finch, a lawyer in 1930s Alabama, as he defends Tom Robinson, a black man falsely accused of rape. Varying from the book, the play has Atticus as the protagonist, not his daughter Scout, allowing his character to change throughout the show. During development the show was involved in two legal disputes, the first with the Lee estate over the faithfulness of the play to the original book, and the second was due to exclusivity to the rights with productions using the script by Christopher Sergel. During opening week, the production garnered more than $1.5 million in box office sales and reviews by publications such as the New York Times, LA Times and AMNY were positive but not without criticism.

Cast

Notable Broadway replacements
 Atticus Finch – Ed Harris, Greg Kinnear
 Scout Finch – Nina Grollman
 Jem Finch – Nick Robinson, Hunter Parrish
 Dill Harris – Taylor Trensch, Noah Robbins
 Bob Ewell – Neal Huff
 Tom Robinson – Kyle Scatliffe, Michael Braugher
 Horace Gilmer – Manoel Felciano
 Judge John Taylor – Gordon Clapp
 Mayella Ewell – Eliza Scanlen
 Link Deas – Russell Harvard
 Boo Radley – Russell Harvard
 Calpurnia – LisaGay Hamilton, Portia
 Ensemble – Yaegel T. Welch

Production history

Broadway (2018–2022) 
It was announced in February 2016 that Aaron Sorkin would bring the Pulitzer Prize-winning novel to Broadway, in a new production produced by Scott Rudin and directed by Bartlett Sher. The book had previously been adapted for the stage but Rudin specified that this production would be completely unrelated to the prior pieces. On February 15, 2018, it was announced that Jeff Daniels would star in the production as Atticus Finch. Celia Keenan-Bolger and Will Pullen were also announced to play Scout and Jem Finch, respectively. The production began previews at the Shubert Theatre on November 1, 2018, prior to an official opening on December 13, 2018.

During production the show was involved in two legal disputes, one with the Harper Lee estate, and the other against licensed productions of the Christopher Sergel adaptation.

On March 12, 2020, the play suspended production due to the COVID-19 pandemic. The play resumed performances on October 5, 2021 at the Shubert Theatre, with the original cast of Jeff Daniels and Celia Keenan-Bolger returning. A new executive producer, Orin Wolf, took over. On January 12, 2022, it was announced the show would play its final performance at the Shubert Theatre on January 16, and reopen at the Belasco Theatre on June 1. Greg Kinnear was set to resume as Atticus Finch when the production reopened. However, Girl From the North Country's run at the Belasco is slated to run through June 11 and a new opening date for Mockingbird has not been announced. On July 29, 2022, it was reported the Broadway production would not reopen after producer Scott Rudin decided that he did not have confidence in the climate for plays the following winter.

West End (2022) 
In 2019 it was announced that the production would transfer to London's West End to the Gielgud Theatre opening in May 2020 with Rhys Ifans as Atticus Finch before being postponed due to the COVID-19 pandemic.

It eventually opened on 31 March 2022 with Rafe Spall replacing Ifans as Atticus Finch, and Gwyneth Keyworth as Scout.

From December 2022 Matthew Modine took over as Atticus Finch.

Legal disputes during production

Sorkin and the Harper Lee estate 
During development of the play, the Lee estate believed that the proposed script varied too much from the book, and a complaint was filed in an Alabama federal court in March 2018. In discussion with Sorkin about the terms of use for the rights to produce a play, it was specified by the estate that the character of Atticus should not deviate from the original character created by Harper Lee. The Lee estate alleged that Sorkin had made too many changes to the original story by framing Atticus as the main character instead of Scout. Sorkin describes how the evolution of Atticus was viewed by the Lee estate as being "far less dignified" than the original character but the show's lawyers disputed this point stating his character "does not derogate or depart from the spirit of the novel." Because the Lee estate lawsuit was jeopardizing the release of the show, a countersuit of $10 million was filed by Sorkin's lawyers in April 2018. In May 2018, the premiere of the show was confirmed after an agreement was reached between the two parties, and both lawsuits were settled.

Rudin against licensed productions 
Before Sorkin adapted To Kill a Mockingbird for the theatre, a different adaptation of the novel by playwright Christopher Sergel had been available for license for over 50 years. Claiming worldwide exclusivity for the professional stage rights to any adaptation of Lee's novel, lawyers acting for the company Scott Rudin formed to produce Sorkin's adaptation, Atticus LLC (ALLC), moved to shut down productions of the Sergel adaption staged within 25 miles of any city that ALLC determined to be a major metropolitan center that might eventually host a production of Sorkin's adaptation, even if that company had already paid the rights holders. Dozens of community and non-profit theaters across the US cancelled productions of Sergel's adaptation, as well as a professional tour planned in the UK. After a public outcry, Scott Rudin offered to "ameliorate the hurt caused" by making Sorkin's adaptation available to regional producers.

Reception

Critical reception 
While some critics criticized the liberties taken by Sorkin, the Los Angeles Times theater critic Charles McNulty however wrote that Sorkin's adaptation "moves as confidently as it speaks even if it doesn't completely add up dramatically." McNulty disputes those who take issue with the changes Sorkin made to the story by stating that Sorkin "created something impeccably fresh." Jesse Green, a theater critic from the New York Times articulated that Sorkin's choice to start with the trial and provide backstory through scenes going back in time was "very effective" for telling the story on stage. Matt Windman argues that "some of Sorkin's choices are questionable" and that the set design was "too distracting to be effective." Windman also articulates that the show "proves to be an engrossing, provocative, and uniformly well-acted adaptation."

Box office 
The show opened on December 13, 2018, during the week ending on December 23, the production grossed over $1.5 million, breaking the record for box office grosses for a non-musical play in a theater owned by The Shubert Organization. Prior to opening, $22 million were made in advance ticket sales at the box office.

Awards and nominations

Broadway production

West End production

References

External links
 

2018 plays
Broadway plays
Courtroom drama plays
To Kill a Mockingbird
Plays based on novels
Plays by Aaron Sorkin
Plays set in Alabama
Plays set in the 1930s
Tony Award-winning plays
Fiction with false allegations of sex crimes
Wrongful convictions in fiction
Plays about race and ethnicity